

Hans von der Mosel (3 May 1898 – 12 April 1969) was a general in the Wehrmacht of Nazi Germany during World War II. He was a recipient of the Knight's Cross of the Iron Cross with Oak Leaves. Mosel surrendered to American forces on 19 September 1944 after the fall of Brest.

Awards and decorations
 Iron Cross (1914) 2nd Class (12 August 1918) 
 Honour Cross of the World War 1914/1918
 Clasp to the Iron Cross (1939) 2nd Class (24 December 1940) & 1st Class (25 July 1941)

 Knight's Cross of the Iron Cross with Oak Leaves
 Knight's Cross on 9 August 1942 as Oberst and commander of Grenadier-Regiment 548
 589th Oak Leaves on 18 September 1944 as Generalmajor and Chief of staff of the fortress Brest (France)

References

Citations

Bibliography

 
 

1898 births
1969 deaths
Major generals of the German Army (Wehrmacht)
German Army personnel of World War I
Recipients of the clasp to the Iron Cross, 2nd class
Recipients of the Knight's Cross of the Iron Cross with Oak Leaves
Saxon nobility
German prisoners of war in World War II held by the United States
People from Děčín
German Army generals of World War II